Pan de siosa, also called pan de leche, is a Filipino pull-apart bread originating from the Visayas Islands of the Philippines. They characteristically have a very soft texture and are baked stuck together. They can be eaten plain with savory meat or soup dishes, or as a dessert brushed with a generous amount of butter and sprinkled with sugar and grated cheese (similar to the Filipino ensaymada). In Bacolod, they can also uniquely be toasted on a skewer and brushed with oil, margarine, or banana ketchup; and then eaten paired with inihaw dishes.

See also
Pastel de Camiguin
Pan de sal
Pan de monja
Pan de coco

References 

Breads
Yeast breads
Southeast Asian breads
Philippine breads
Visayan cuisine